The Yukon Time Zone was a time zone that kept standard time; Yukon Standard Time (YST) was obtained by subtracting nine hours from Coordinated Universal Time (UTC) resulting in UTC−09:00. Yukon Daylight Time (YDT) when observed was eight hours behind UTC. In 1983 the UTC−09:00 based time zone was restructured and renamed the Alaska Time Zone.

Extent and history
When it was created, the Yukon Time Zone included Yukon, and a small region around Yakutat, Alaska (Alaska had been spread across four different time zones at the time).

Yukon, which had adopted Yukon Standard Time in 1900, observed a one-hour advance in 1918 and 1919, and again year-round from February 1942 to September 1945 (Yukon War Time then, after V-J Day, Yukon Prevailing Time).

In 1965, from the last Sunday in April to the last Sunday in September, double daylight time a two-hour advance was observed.  On July 1, 1966, most of the Yukon switched to Pacific Standard Time (PST), which is UTC-08:00, leaving Dawson City and Old Crow on Yukon time.  The remaining area changed to Pacific Time on October 28, 1973, leaving only Yakutat on the Yukon Time Zone.

On October 30, 1983, coincident with the end of daylight saving time, Alaska switched in 1983 from four time zones to two time zones.  The areas east of Yakutat set clocks back two hours to change from Pacific Daylight Time to what had been Yukon Standard Time, UTC-09:00, and the time zone was named Alaska Standard Time at the end of November.  Yakutat only set clocks back one hour on that date.  Most of the remaining longitudes of Alaska left their clocks unchanged on that date, changing from Alaska-Hawaii Daylight Time (UTC-09:00) to the new Alaska Standard Time (UTC-09:00). Some areas that had been on Bering Time (UTC-11:00 in winter, UTC-10:00 in summer) such as Nome set their clocks ahead yet another hour on October 30, 1983 to adopt Alaska Standard Time (the former Yukon Standard Time), effectively changing their standard time zone by two hours.  Most of the Aleutian Islands moved from the Bering Time Zone (UTC-11:00) to the Hawaii-Aleutian Standard Time Zone (UTC-10:00) (until 1983 known as the Alaska-Hawaii Standard Time Zone).

Notes

See also
 Mountain Time Zone
 Central Time Zone
 Eastern Time Zone
 Atlantic Time Zone
 Newfoundland Time Zone
 Saskatchewan Time

1983 disestablishments in Alaska
Political history of Alaska
Time in Canada
Time zones in the United States
Time zones
1900 establishments in Yukon